Edgardo Pagarigan (born 11 July 1958) is a Filipino former cyclist. He competed in the points race event at the 1984 Summer Olympics.

References

External links
 

1958 births
Living people
Filipino male cyclists
Olympic cyclists of the Philippines
Cyclists at the 1984 Summer Olympics
Place of birth missing (living people)
Asian Games medalists in cycling
Cyclists at the 1982 Asian Games
Asian Games bronze medalists for the Philippines
Medalists at the 1982 Asian Games